Dayne Kelly and Marinko Matosevic won the title, beating Omar Jasika and Bradley Mousley 7–5, 6–2

Seeds

Draw

Draw

References
 Main Draw

Latrobe City Traralgon ATP Challenger - Doubles
Latrobe City Traralgon ATP Challenger